Shannon Rachelle Hall (born April 18, 1970) is an American professional boxer, wrestler, bodybuilder, martial artist, and actress. She was the first ever Toughwoman Champion and competed on American Gladiators as Dallas. She has also worked as a professional boxer in the IFBA Boxing League. She has competed on ESPN, starred in two pay-per-views, and featured in Sports Illustrated, Muscle & Fitness and USA Today.

Career
In 1993, Hall was selected out of hundreds of female contestants across the United States to star as "Dallas" on the syndicated television show, The American Gladiators (1993–1994), in Los Angeles. She went on to win the "Alumni Special" on the series, defeating fellow gladiator ZAP for the Alumni title. Hall continued playing "Dallas" in the American Gladiators's Orlando Live Dinner Show from 1995–1998 in Kissimmee, Florida.

Hall was also a fitness competitor, winning the Fitness America California Pageant in 1993, then placing fourth in the Nationals on ESPN.

In 1996, in Detroit, Michigan, a "Toughwoman" contest was added to the Toughman Contest circuit. Hall entered upon invitation and won the $10,000 Boxing Grand Prize, a professional boxing contract and the Toughwoman World Championship title.

In 1998, Hall successfully defended her Toughwoman title on pay-per-view, winning the IFBA Pro. Platinum Division belt against three other professional women boxers. Hall went undefeated in ten fights in Toughwoman contests.

In February 1998, Hall and Fernandez became the first women to box professionally in Madison Square Garden. (Hall) Under Dore Management, (Fernandez) Top Rank Boxing, we’re in a match on a Buster Douglas undercard. Hall won by a technical knock out defeating Tera "The Hot Tamale" Fernandez in the first round.

In addition, as a Martial Artist, Hall entered the Wushu Unlimited Martial Arts Tournament in Orlando, Florida, winning Women's San Shou Competition. Men's San Shou Champion, Cung Le, taught Shannon briefly before the competition, the rules of San Shou, including punching, kicking and taking down your opponent. Hall learned quickly and dominated her opponent to win the tournament.

Hall trained with professional boxing trainers Murray Sutherland, Jeff Gibson, and Frank Pezzulo, and studied kickboxing with Mosama Ruben Morales and Muy Thai under Sifu David Krapes. She was a stable-mate and training partners with Former Boxing World Champion Hector "Macho" Camacho and Pro. Lightweight Boxer Earnest "M16" Mateen.

In her third boxing title attempt in 1999 for the IBA Super-Middleweight Belt, Hall faced off against Suzy Taylor. Hall lost to Taylor in the 9th round via referee stoppage, and soon after retired from Boxing. Shortly thereafter, she signed with the World Wrestling Federation and toured with them for one year.

Personal life
Shannon attended Arkansas State University where she joined Delta Zeta (Omicron Epsilon chapter).

In 2001, Shannon gave birth to her son. In 2005, she had a daughter.

Accomplishments
 Miss Fitness America finalist (California Winner)
 Toughwoman World Champion
 IFBA Platinum Boxing Champion
 Wushu San Shou Women's Champion
American Gladiator Television Alumni Champion

References

1970 births
American women boxers
Living people
Arkansas State University alumni
Boxers from Arkansas
People from Jonesboro, Arkansas
21st-century American women